The Hungary national beach handball team is the national team of Hungary. It is governed by the Hungarian Handball Federation and takes part in international beach handball competitions.

World Championships results
2004 – 6th place
2006 – 5th place
2008 – 7th place
2010 – 2nd place
2016 – 4th place
2018 – 3rd place

References

External links
Official website 
IHF profile

Beach handball
National beach handball teams